Gulu is a city in the Northern Region of Uganda. It is the commercial and administrative centre of Gulu District.

Gulu is served by Gulu Airport.

History
During the British Bagool rule in the 18th and 19th centuries, northern Uganda was less developed compared to the rest of the country. The people were conscripted into the army and the police. Many were sent to fight in the first and second World Wars.

In the 1960s, many Sudanese, Rwandese, and Congolese refugees settled in the city.

The Lord's Resistance Army (LRA) under the leadership of Joseph Kony sprang up in the 1990s after Auma/Lakwena went to Kenya. The LRA became increasingly violent in Gulu and surrounding communities. Up to 15,000 children, known as "night commuters", were fleeing into the city for safety every evening. In 1996, the Ugandan government ordered all civilians in northern Uganda to relocate to internally displaced person (IDP) camps. Several organizations, such as Stop the Genocide in Northern Uganda, called these camps "concentration camps" and demanded their immediate closure. At one time, an estimated two million people lived in these camps. In April 2009, all the IDP camps were closed and the people were allowed to return to their villages. By July 2009, an estimated 1,452,000 people (80.7 percent of those living in the camps) had voluntarily left the camps to return home. Since the spring of 2007, there has been relative peace in the region as the LRA became a much less significant threat.

Climate
Gulu's climate is tropical wet and dry (Aw) according to the Köppen-Geiger climate classification system.

Demographics
The national census in 2002 estimated Gulu's population at 119,430. The Uganda Bureau of Statistics (UBOS) estimated the population at 149,900 in 2010. In 2011, UBOS estimated the mid-year population at 154,300. The 2014 population census put the population at 152,276.

In 2020, the mid-year population of Gulu City was projected by city division as follows: Bar Dege (47,700), Laroo (32,300), Layibi (43,900) and Pece (53,500), for a total of 177,400.

Education
Gulu is the home of Gulu University, which has a wide range of programs including agriculture, medicine, business management, and conflict resolution. It is one of the three public universities in the Northern Region, the others being Muni University in Arua and Lira University in Lira. Gulu University is the parent institution of the Gulu University School of Medicine, one of the nine accredited medical schools in Uganda as of February 2015. The Uganda Management Institute, a government-owned tertiary teaching and research institution in management and administration, has a campus in Gulu. Gulu also hosts University of the Sacred Heart Gulu, a private university affiliated with the Roman Catholic Archdiocese of Gulu.

Health
There are three hospitals in the city: St. Mary's Hospital Lacor, the Gulu Regional Referral Hospital, and Gulu Independent Hospital.

There is also a center for non-medical integrative therapies, Thrive-Gulu, founded by Boston-based professor Judy Dushku and her husband Jim Coleman, and part-funded by Eliza Dushku; it has received funding support from Irish aid agency Trocaire and a Scandinavian foreign aid provider.

Transport

Air
The city is served by Gulu Airport, which has a tarmac runway that measures . Gulu Airport is the second biggest airport in Uganda after Entebbe International Airport.

Rail
Gulu has a station on the metre gauge railway that connects Tororo and Pakwach, which had been out of service since 1993. Rift Valley Railways funded the clearing of vegetation and the repair of infrastructure, thus allowing the first commercial train for 20 years to run through Gulu on 14 September 2013.

Sport
The home venue for Gulu United FC is Pece War Memorial Stadium, which has a capacity of 3,000 people. The stadium was built by the British in 1959, with long-delayed renovations starting in April 2017.

Places of worship    
Predominant among the places of worship are Christian facilities for communities including the: Roman Catholic Archdiocese of Gulu (Catholic Church), Eastern Orthodox Diocese of Gulu (Patriarchate of Alexandria), Church of Uganda (Anglican Communion), Presbyterian Church in Uganda (World Communion of Reformed Churches), Baptist Union of Uganda (Baptist World Alliance), Assemblies of God, and the Church of Jesus Christ of Latter-day Saints.  There are also Muslim mosques.

Water and sanitation
With loans obtained from the World Bank and KfW, the government of Uganda in 2020, completed Phase I of the Gulu Water Supply and Sanitation Project. The project required USh82.3 billion (US$22+ million) to be implemented. In addition, at least 42 public toilets have been built, capable of accommodating 250 people simultaneously. A new sewage sludge treatment plant in Cubu has been constructed.

Phase II of the project involves establishment of a drinking water intake plant, upstream of Karuma Hydroelectric Power Station, with pumping capacity of  daily. This new potable water source will supply 341,000 people in Gulu and neighboring communities. It also includes the expansion of safe sanitation services to 170,000 new customers. KfW and the CDC Group are expected to fund the second stage, starting in June 2021.

Notable people
Okot p'Bitek, poet
 Taban Lo Liyong, poet and writer
Otema Alimadi, former premier of Uganda
Lumix Da Don, musical artist
Catherine Kyobutungi, born here in 1972
 Pen-Mogi Nyeko, veterinarian, academic and statesman. Former Vice Chancellor of Gulu University 2002–2018.
Betty Aol Ocan, Politician, Former Leader of Opposition in the 10th Parliament of Uganda.
Norbert Mao, President Democratic Party, Former Member of Parliament Gulu Municipality, Former LC5 Gulu District.
Brig. George W.A. Nyero, Former UNLA Senior Commander, Army Representative in the Parliament of Uganda.
Oyet Francis Wod-Jal, Media Personnel, Software engineer and investigative journalist.

See also
 Railway stations in Uganda
 Acholi sub-region
 List of cities and towns in Uganda

References

External links
 New Cities Raise Great Expectations In Investments, Revenue As of 23 May 2019.
 Gulu Methodist Partnership Incorporated As of 3 February 2017.

 
Gulu District
Acholi sub-region
Cities in the Great Rift Valley
Populated places in Northern Region, Uganda